Panna cotta (Italian for "cooked cream") is an Italian dessert of sweetened cream thickened with gelatin and molded. The cream may be aromatized with coffee, vanilla, or other flavorings.

History
The name panna cotta is not mentioned in Italian cookbooks before the 1960s, yet it is often cited as a traditional dessert of the northern Italian region of Piedmont. One unverified story says that it was invented by a Hungarian woman in the Langhe in the early 1900s. An 1879 dictionary mentions a dish called latte inglese ("English milk"), made of cream cooked with gelatin and molded, though other sources say that latte inglese is made with egg yolks, like crème anglaise; perhaps the name covered any thickened custard-like preparation.

The dish might also come from the French recipe of fromage bavarois from Marie-Antoine Carême. Actually, this recipe that we can find in le pâtissier royal parisien is the same as the modern panna cotta with the difference that one part of the cream is whipped to make chantilly and included to the preparation before adding the gelatin.

The Region of Piedmont includes panna cotta in its 2001 list of traditional food products. Its recipe includes cream, milk, sugar, vanilla, gelatin, rum, and marsala poured into a mold with caramel. Another author considers the traditional flavoring to be peach eau-de-vie, and the traditional presentation not to have sauce or other garnishes.

Panna cotta became fashionable in the United States in the 1990s.

Preparation

Sugar is dissolved in warm cream. The cream may be flavored by infusing spices and the like in it or by adding rum, coffee, vanilla, and so on. Gelatin is dissolved in a cold liquid (usually water), then added to the warm cream mixture. This is poured into molds and allowed to set. The molds may have caramel in the bottoms, giving a result similar to a crème caramel. After it solidifies, the panna cotta is usually unmolded onto a serving plate.

Although the name means 'cooked cream,' the ingredients are only warm enough to dissolve the gelatin and sugar. Italian recipes sometimes call for colla di pesce 'fish glue,' which may literally be isinglass or, more likely, simply a name for common gelatin.

Garnishes

Panna cotta is often served with a coulis of berries or a sauce of caramel or chocolate. It may be covered with other fruits  or liqueurs.

Related dishes

Bavarian cream is similar to panna cotta but usually includes eggs as well as gelatin and is mixed with whipped cream before setting.

Blancmange is sometimes thickened with gelatin or isinglass, sometimes with starch.

Panna cotta is sometimes called a custard, but true custard is thickened with egg yolks, not gelatin.

See also

 List of Italian desserts
 Fruit fool

References

Italian desserts
Puddings
Gelatin
Cuisine of Piedmont